V is the fifth studio album by Finnish singer Anna Abreu, released in Finland by Warner Bros. Records on May 30, 2014. The album was preceded by the lead single "Ra-Ta Ta-Ta" and followed by the single "Right In Front Of You". The album marked Abreu's first studio album in three years, following her fourth album Rush. It was also Abreu's first album released under Warner Bros. Records, which she signed with in 2012 after deciding not to renew her contract with Sony Music and RCA.

The album was produced by Jonas Karlsson, Jarkko Ehnqvist and Hank Solo, and features collaborations with Danish pop singer Christopher and Finnish rapper Gracias. The album debuted and peaked at number 4 on the Finnish Albums Chart, becoming Abreu's first album to miss the top two. However, the album continued to be a commercial and critical success for Abreu, being certified gold for sales in excess of 10,000 copies.

Commercial performance
V debuted and peaked at number four on the Finnish Top 50 Albums Chart. To date it has sold over 10,000 copies and been certified gold by the IFPI.

Chart performance

Singles
 "Ra-Ta Ta-Ta", the lead single from the album debuted and peaked at number 17 on the Finnish Top 20 Singles Chart and reached a peak of number 4 on the radio airplay chart. The music video, directed by Hannu Aukia, has been viewed over 1,000,000 times on YouTube. The video sees Abreu dancing in an underground carpark, partying in a roller-rink and singing in a dark room while covered in silver glitter.
 "Right In Front Of You", the album's second single, was released to radio stations on June 2, 2014. The 90's inspired music video was directed by Taito Kawata and features Abreu and a large group of friends dancing in a range of places in and around the Finnish capital city of Helsinki.

Track listing

Promotion

In 2014, Abreu promoted her fifth album with the V Tour throughout Finland.

Setlist

Tour dates

References

2014 albums
Anna Abreu albums